Joe O'Shea (Irish: Seosáf/Seosamh Ó Sé) is an Irish broadcaster and journalist. He lives and works in London & Dublin and makes regular appearances on Irish radio and television.

Career
Joe O'Shea was educated at St Mary's of the Isle Convent, Sullivans Quay CBS, Cork and Deerpark CBS, Cork. O'Shea began his career as a trainee with The Star newspaper covering 'bread and butter' stories in the 1980s. He would later cover stories on other food combinations such as fish and chips. In 1991, he became a staff journalist and over the next few years he interviewed celebrities, including Bono, David Bowie and Colin Farrell. During the nineties he covered some of Ireland's biggest stories, such as the negotiation of the Good Friday Agreement.  When he travelled to Rwanda in 1998 with aid agency Trocaire, he spent two weeks conducting interviews with the survivors of genocide and chronicling the devastating effects of the civil war.

Towards the end of the decade O'Shea was assigned to follow the Republic of Ireland national football team on all away games in search of a news angle. His personal highlight came in Japan and Korea in 2002 when he spent three weeks on the road immersed in Roy Keane and ticket scams.  O'Shea began writing more colour and feature pieces for The Star.  He became a freelance journalist. He pursued his interest in classic cars by acting as Motoring Correspondent for The Sunday Business Post. He also penned the Newshound column for In Dublin magazine on media issues.

After writing articles appearing in The Irish Independent and The Evening Herald, he was a frequent guest on radio for Newstalk 106 and TV with Setanta Sports.
O'Shea was offered a job co-presenting a new magazine/lifestyle programme - Seoige and O'Shea - with Grainne Seoige in October 2006. In 2007, he made numerous television appearances on other shows such as Charity You're A Star and The Late Late Show.
In June 2008, O'Shea left RTÉ and continued to work as a freelance journalist for various national news organisations.

In August 2009. he appeared in the RTÉ programme, Charity Lords of the Ring.

Personal life
Joe O'Shea lives and works in Dublin, is married, and continues to work as a freelance journalist & broadcaster, enjoying regular appearances on radio shows such as The Marian Finucane Show and The Last Word With Matt Cooper.

O'shea was charged with driving under the influence of alcohol and received a ban from driving for one year upon entering a guilty plea in court proceedings.

References

External links
 Joe O'Shea's Profile

Year of birth missing (living people)
Date of birth missing (living people)
Living people
People from Cork (city)
Participants in Irish reality television series
RTÉ television presenters
You're a Star contestants